This is a list of members of the South Australian House of Assembly from 1927 to 1930, as elected at the 1927 state election:

 Port Adelaide Independent Labor MHA Thomas Thompson was unseated on 30 May 1927, after a challenge from defeated Labor MHA Frank Condon over a defamatory pamphlet. Thompson contested and won the resulting by-election on 2 July.
 In February 1928, four members of the Country Party, Reginald Carter (Burra Burra), Edward Coles (Flinders) and Malcolm McIntosh and Frederick McMillan (Albert), resigned from the party and joined the Liberal Federation following the breakdown of amalgamation talks.
 Wooroora Liberal MHA James McLachlan resigned on 31 January 1930. No by-election was held due to the proximity of the 1930 state election.

References

Members of South Australian parliaments by term
20th-century Australian politicians